Agerskov is a surname of Danish origin. People with this surname include:

 Michael Agerskov (1870–1933), Danish writer; husband of Johanne
 Johanne Agerskov (1873–1946), Danish spiritualist; wife of Michael

Agerskov is also a place in Denmark